Suzie Cracks the Whip is American jam band Blues Traveler's eleventh studio album, released on June 26, 2012.

The album debuted at #91 on the Billboard 200, the band's highest position on the chart since 2001.

Track listing
"You Don't Have to Love Me" (Aaron Beavers) – 3:43
"Recognize My Friend" (John Popper, Brendan Hill, Ron Sexsmith) – 3:48
"Devil in the Details" (Popper, Chan Kinchla, Sexsmith) – 3:55
"All Things Are Possible" (Popper, C. Kinchla) – 3:34
"Things Are Looking Up" (Popper, Tad Kinchla, Sexsmith) – 4:24
"Love Is Everything (That I Describe)" (Popper, Sexsmith) – 2:21
"I Don't Wanna Go" (Popper, Carrie Rodriguez) – 3:51
"Nobody Fall in Love With Me" (Popper) – 3:10
"Cover Me" (Ben Wilson) – 3:27
"Saving Grace" (Chris Barron) – 3:42
"Big City Girls" (Popper, T. Kinchla, Wilson, Beavers) – 3:27
"Cara Let the Moon" (Popper) – 3:26

Personnel
John Popper – Harmonica, Vocals
Chan Kinchla – Acoustic and Electric Guitars, Mandolin
Ben Wilson - Keyboards
Tad Kinchla – Bass
Brendan Hill – Percussion, Drums
 With: Crystal Bowersox - Backing Vocals on "I Don't Wanna Go"

References

2012 albums
Blues Traveler albums
429 Records albums